

Current squad

first team

Transfers

Summer

In:

 

 

 

 

Out:

Winter

In:

Out:

Pre-season and friendlies

UEFA Champions League

Second qualifying round

 Order of legs reversed after original draw.
 Maccabi Tel Aviv won 3–0 on aggregate.

Third qualifying round

Maccabi lost and entered the 2014–15 UEFA Europa League play-off round.

UEFA Europa League

Play-off round

Israeli Premier League

Regular season

Championship Round

Israel State Cup

Toto cup

Group stage

Quarter-final

Semi-final

Final

References

Maccabi Tel Aviv
Maccabi Tel Aviv F.C. seasons